George Christopher Pepys Cutts (29 June 1914 – 4 April 1974) was, from 1964 to 1974, the fifth Bishop of Buckingham in the Church of England.

Pepys was educated at Winchester College and Oriel College, Oxford and studied for ordination at Ripon College Cuddesdon before a curacy at St John the Divine's Kennington. After wartime service in the Royal Naval Volunteer Reserve (RNVR) he was successively Rector of Hartfield, Sussex, Vicar of St Mark's Portsea and, before his ordination to the episcopate, Rural Dean of Liverpool. He died in post in 1974. He was survived by his wife, Elizabeth (d. 2009), who later married another Church of England Bishop, Michael Mann.

References

1914 births
People educated at Winchester College
Alumni of Oriel College, Oxford
Royal Naval Volunteer Reserve personnel of World War II
Alumni of Ripon College Cuddesdon
Bishops of Buckingham
1974 deaths
Royal Navy chaplains